Theobald Fitzwalter Butler, 14th Baron Dunboyne (11 February 1806 – 22 March 1881) was an Irish peer.

He was the son of James Butler, 13th Baron Dunboyne by his first wife, Eleanor O'Connell. On 6 July 1850, he succeeded to his father's titles as the 14th and 24th Baron Dunboyne. His right to the title was confirmed by the House of Lords on 10 August 1860. Dunboyne was elected as a representative peer for Ireland in 1868, and sat on the Conservative benches in the Lords until his death.

He married Julia Celestina Maria Brander, daughter of William Brander, on 14 November 1832. Together they had seven children.

References

1806 births
1881 deaths
Barons Dunboyne
Theobald
Conservative Party (UK) hereditary peers
Irish representative peers